Plumieux (Gallo: Ploemioec) is a commune in the Côtes-d'Armor department of Brittany in northwestern France.

Inhabitants of Plumieux are called plumetais and plumetaise in French.

Politics and administration 
As of 2020 municipal election, the Conseil Municipal de Plumieux is composed of 15 elected members, including the Mayor. The communes representation on the conseil communautaire of Loudéac Communauté - Bretagne Centre also consists of one elected member.

Local culture and heritage

Significant places and monuments 

 Saint-Pierre Church (French: Église Saint-Pierre).
 16th century cemetery cross (French: Croix du cimetière).
 Historic St. Leau chapelle (French: Ancienne chapelle de St. Leau), since torn down.

See also
Communes of the Côtes-d'Armor department

References

External links

Communes of Côtes-d'Armor